Skarstein is a surname. Notable people with the surname include:

Asbjørn Skarstein (1922–1999), Norwegian civil servant and diplomat
Birgit Skarstein (born 1989), Norwegian competitive adaptive rower and para cross-country skier
Inger-Lise Skarstein (born 1937), Norwegian politician
Jakob Skarstein (1921–2021), Norwegian radio personality
Rune Skarstein (born 1940), Norwegian economist 
Vigdis Moe Skarstein (born 1946), Norwegian librarian